Lyudmila Ivanovna Kasatkina (15 May 192522 February 2012) was a Soviet and Russian actress who starred in a string of war-related films directed by her husband Sergey Kolosov.

Biography 
Kasatkina was born in a village near Vyazemsky Uyezd, Smolensk Oblast, and attended a ballet school. After breaking her leg at age 14, she gave up her dream of dancing and joined the Russian Institute of Theatre Arts. Kasatkina joined the troupe of the Red Army Theatre in 1947 and worked there for the rest of her life. Her breakthrough film role was a tiger tamer in Tamer of Tigers (1955) where she was body/stunt doubled by Margarita Nazarova, a professionally trained tiger handler. She appeared in such film adaptations as The Taming of the Shrew (1961) and The Darling (1966, after Chekhov).

Kasatkina was named a People's Artist of the USSR in 1975 and was awarded the Order "For Merit to the Fatherland" 2 class in 2010. She died in Moscow eleven days after the death of her husband, Sergey Kolosov. The couple were buried in the Novodevichy Cemetery.

Selected filmography 
 Tamer of Tigers (Укротительница тигров, 1955) as Lena Vorontsova
 Honeymoon (Медовый месяц, 1956) as Lyuda Odintsova
 Adventures of Mowgli (Маугли, 1967–71) as Bagheera (voice)
 Big School-Break (Большая перемена, 1972) as The School Director)
 Remember Your Name (Помни имя своё, 1974) as Zinaida Grigorievna Vorobyova The Circus Princess (Принцесса цирка, 1982) as Madame Caroline Mother Mary (Мать Мария, 1982) as Maria Skobtsova Poisons or the World History of Poisoning (Яды, или Всемирная история отравлений, 2001) as Eugenia Ivanovna Kholodkova''

References

External links 
 
 

1925 births
2012 deaths
20th-century Russian actresses
21st-century Russian actresses
People from Vyazemsky Uyezd
Academicians of the Russian Academy of Cinema Arts and Sciences "Nika"
Russian Academy of Theatre Arts alumni
Honored Artists of the RSFSR
People's Artists of the RSFSR
People's Artists of the USSR
Recipients of the Lenin Komsomol Prize
Recipients of the Order "For Merit to the Fatherland", 2nd class
Recipients of the Order "For Merit to the Fatherland", 3rd class
Recipients of the Order "For Merit to the Fatherland", 4th class
Recipients of the Order of Lenin
Recipients of the Order of the Red Banner of Labour
Recipients of the Vasilyev Brothers State Prize of the RSFSR
Russian drama teachers
Russian film actresses
Russian stage actresses
Russian television actresses
Russian voice actresses
Soviet drama teachers
Soviet film actresses
Soviet stage actresses
Soviet television actresses
Soviet voice actresses
Burials at Novodevichy Cemetery